Michael O. Johnson (1954) is an American business executive, who worked as the president of the international division at the Walt Disney Company and was the CEO of Herbalife Nutrition.

Early life

Michael O. Johnson is a former CEO of Herbalife Nutrition. He previously served as President of The Walt Disney Company, Publisher of Audio Times magazine, and held roles at The Movie Channel, Nickelodeon, and MTV channels of the Warner Amex Satellite Entertainment Company. Johnson received his Bachelor of Arts in Political Science from Western State Colorado University.

Early career

Disney

Johnson worked at the Walt Disney Company for 17 years at Walt Disney International before he became president in 2000. During that time, he expanded Disney's international home video business and concentrated on making Disney's global operations and business relations more efficient. He created Disney subsidiaries in Asia, Europe, Africa, Latin America, and the Middle East, and increased Disney's international markets from 34 to 80. Under Johnson's leadership, Disney became the top home distribution organization, and led the company to produce over $1 billion in revenue.

Johnson notably set out to acquire the film library of Japanese anime director-animator Hayao Miyazaki. Johnson had, in fact, previously commented on the allure of Miyazaki's filmography in the 1998 HBO TV special Animation, Anime, and Spawn: Cartoons Just Grew Up, "We have many animators here inside the Disney Corporation who are very...enthused by our relationship with Miyazaki and are also big fans of his." While individual films by Miyazaki had previously been licensed for the U.S., such as the Fox Video release of My Neighbor Totoro, an acquisition of the complete film library was made difficult, as Miyazaki's relationship with international redistribution had been soured by significantly altered releases of Miyazaki's films, such as the highly edited New World Pictures release of Nausicaä of the Valley of the Wind as Warriors of the Wind. After some negotiations, Johnson's team was able to secure the rights to Miyazaki's complete library.

Herbalife

As CEO

Johnson joined Herbalife Nutrition as CEO in 2003, and served as Chairman beginning in 2007.

Johnson emphasized the need to pivot the Herbalife brand away from being exclusively concerned with weight-loss products and the broader perceptions associated with multi-level marketing, a view which he described in an interview with Fortune Magazine as, “When I took over in 2003, Herbalife was a multilevel-marketing company that sold nutrition products. Now it’s a nutrition company that uses multilevel marketing as its distribution channel.” To achieve this, Johnson instituted quality controls, moved Herbalife's product manufacturing to be in-house, and widened Herbalife's product offerings. To emphasize Herbalife's new focus on general fitness and nutrition, Johnson expanded its sports sponsorships to include more than 200 teams and athletes, such as Cristiano Ronaldo, as well as company sponsorship of the LA Galaxy professional soccer team. Johnson also sought to minimize company claims to distributors around exceptional “business opportunity" to set a more realistic tone during pitches.

Johnson came to prominence between 2012 and 2015 following a short sale of Herbalife stock by Bill Ackman and his hedge fund Pershing Square Capital Management. Ackman alleged that Herbalife is a pyramid scheme and built a billion-dollar short position in Herbalife stock. Ackman's short position was widely covered by American media outlets and was the subject of the documentary Betting on Zero.

Johnson transitioned to the position of Executive Chairman in 2017, before returning to the role of Chairman and CEO in 2019. During this time, Herbalife Nutrition grew its net sales from $1.1 billion in 2003 to $4.4 billion in 2017.

Return as Interim CEO

Johnson was made interim CEO at the beginning of 2019 following the resignation of Richard Goudis.

In October 2022, Michael O. Johnson was named Chairman and interim Chief Executive Officer following the departure of Dr. John Agwunobi.

References

Living people
1954 births
American chief executives
People associated with direct selling
Western Colorado University alumni